A public joint-stock company, abbreviated PJSC (abbreviated ) or open joint-stock company, abbreviated OJSC (abbreviated ), is a type of company in many successor states of the Soviet Union, in particular in Russia.  Its distinguishing feature is the right of stockholders to trade in stocks without the permission of other stockholders.

These public stock companies are somewhat comparable to limited liability partnerships or corporations under US law.

Examples in CIS

See also
 Types of business entity in Russia
 Government-owned corporation in Russia
 Unitary enterprise

References

External links
 Public joint-stock company at International Legal Corporation

Economy of Russia
Types of business entity